Pituna is a genus of fish in the family Rivulidae. These annual killifish are endemic to seasonal pools, swamps and lagoons in the Araguaia–Tocantins, Xingu, uppermost Paraná and Paranaíba river basins in Brazil. Most are from savanna regions, but P. xinguensis is from the Amazon rainforest.

Males are overall brownish with a spotted greenish-golden, turquoise or blue pattern, and a blue-black spot at the operculum. Females are far duller.

Species
Pituna and the closely related Maratecoara, Papiliolebias, Plesiolebias and Stenolebias form a clade, Plesiolebiasini.

There are currently six recognized species in Pituna:

 Pituna brevirostrata W. J. E. M. Costa, 2007
 Pituna compacta (G. S. Myers, 1927)
 Pituna obliquoseriata W. J. E. M. Costa, 2007
 Pituna poranga W. J. E. M. Costa, 1989
 Pituna schindleri W. J. E. M. Costa, 2007
 Pituna xinguensis W. J. E. M. Costa & D. T. B. Nielsen, 2007

References

Rivulidae
Freshwater fish genera